Robert Bennett (August 9, 1919 – December 13, 1974) was an American athlete who competed mainly in the hammer throw.

He competed for the United States in the 1948 Summer Olympics held in London, Great Britain in the hammer throw where he won the bronze medal.

External links

American male hammer throwers
Olympic bronze medalists for the United States in track and field
Athletes (track and field) at the 1948 Summer Olympics
1919 births
1974 deaths
Medalists at the 1948 Summer Olympics